Caloptilia elaeas is a moth of the family Gracillariidae. It is known from New Zealand.

The larvae of this species feed on Coriaria plumosa, mining and folding the leaves. It is likely that larvae of this species also feed on other Coriaria species.

References

External links
Image 

elaeas
Moths of New Zealand
Moths described in 1911